Hartsdale station is a commuter rail stop on the Metro-North Railroad's Harlem Line, serving the communities of Greenburgh and Scarsdale, New York.

History
The station building was originally built in 1915 (or 1914 according to the MTA) by the Warren and Wetmore architectural firm for the New York Central Railroad, as a replacement for a smaller wooden depot built by the New York and Harlem Railroad originally known as "Hart's Corner Station." Unlike most Warren & Wetmore-built NYC stations, which were grand cathedral-like structures using Beaux-Arts architecture, the station in particular was strictly of the Tudor Revival style. The station was named after the valley owned by the Harts.

As with most of the Harlem Line, the merger of New York Central with Pennsylvania Railroad in 1968 transformed the station into a Penn Central Railroad station. Penn Central's continuous financial despair throughout the 1970s forced them to turn over their commuter service to the Metropolitan Transportation Authority which made it part of Metro-North in 1983. In 2011, it was listed on the National Register of Historic Places.

Station layout
The station has two slightly offset high-level side platforms, each 12 cars long.

Public art
The station is the site of Workers, a series of sculptures by Tom Nussbaum portraying silhouettes of railroad workers and commuters. The sculptures are rendered in COR-TEN® steel and placed between the northbound and southbound tracks. Additional monumentally-scaled human figures made of iron are situated in the track bed.

In popular culture
The station was used in the third season of The Sinner as a stand in for the fictional Dorchester station.

See also
National Register of Historic Places listings in southern Westchester County, New York

Bibliography

References

External links

Hartsdale Metro-North Station (TheSubwayNut)
Fenimore Road entrance from Google Maps Street View
Station House from Google Maps Street View

Metro-North Railroad stations in New York (state)
Former New York Central Railroad stations
Railway stations on the National Register of Historic Places in New York (state)
National Register of Historic Places in Westchester County, New York
Historic American Buildings Survey in New York (state)
Railway stations in Westchester County, New York
Railway stations in the United States opened in 1844
1844 establishments in New York (state)
Warren and Wetmore buildings
Transportation in Westchester County, New York